Bill Elsworth (2 August 1936 – 25 October 1996) was an  Australian rules footballer who played with Hawthorn in the Victorian Football League (VFL).

Notes

External links 

1936 births
1996 deaths
Australian rules footballers from Victoria (Australia)
Hawthorn Football Club players
Heidelberg Football Club players